Marian Wilson Kimber is an American musicologist and a Professor of Music at the University of Iowa. Having completed a dissertation on the autograph scores of Felix Mendelssohn's piano concertos, Wilson Kimber received her PhD in Musicology from Florida State University in 1993. Her work covers topics of gender, biography, performance, and bibliography in the nineteenth century. Specifically, she has published on Felix Mendelssohn-Bartholdy and Fanny Mendelssohn Hensel, Jane Austen, spoken-word recitation to musical accompaniment, and female performance genres. Wilson Kimber's recent book The Elocutionists: Women, Music, and the Spoken Word (University of Illinois Press, 2017), was a recipient of grants from both the American Musicological Society and the Society for American Music.

References

Year of birth missing (living people)
Living people
American women musicologists
21st-century American musicologists
21st-century American women writers
University of Iowa faculty
Florida State University alumni
21st-century American non-fiction writers
American women non-fiction writers